Anshu Gupta is an Indian entrepreneur. He founded the non-governmental organization Goonj. Goonj works on bridging urban and rural inequality. It does this by channelizing the urban surplus to initiate rural uplift, disaster relief, and rehabilitation. Through Goonj, Anshu is building a parallel trash-based economy by creating barter between rural communities and urban surplus material.

Early life 
Anshu Gupta was born in Meerut. He spent his early years in Chakrata, Banbasa while his father was posted there in the Indian Army's Military Engineer Services (MES).

Career 
He worked as a freelance journalist after completing his schooling. He wrote about history, monuments and humanitarian issues. From 1992 to 1998, he worked with many organizations. He worked as a copywriter with Chaitra followed by Power Grid Corporation, and finally Escorts Communication.

Goonj 
He realized that people need clothing, which poor people may find out of reach. In 1999, he started Goonj with his wife Meenakshi and friends to work on that basic need. He started with 67 pieces of cloth collected with his wife and friends, at their home in Sarita Vihar. The firm spread across 28 states and over 4000 villages, employing over 1000 workers. Using cloth as a metaphor for other crucial but ignored needs, his ideology stated that roti, kapda, makaan are the three most essential individual needs. The first two are always in focus, but clothing never received the attention it deserved but is essential in maintaining individual dignity.

"Clothing is the first visible sign of poverty". It is essential to satisfy basic clothing needs. Under Anshu's leadership, Goonj has taken ever-growing urban waste and used it as a tool to trigger development work on diverse issues in remote areas of India.

Cloth for Work 
Under Goonj's initiative 'Cloth for Work', village communities across India work on their issues and get urban material for their efforts. The focus is on dignity and how cloth can help defend that dignity. Cloth for Work and other Goonj initiatives have received various national and international recognition. Goonj helps victims during natural calamities such as floods and earthquakes.

He is popularly known as the clothing man of India for his achievement bringing clothing into the map of development work.

In "Cloth for Work", villagers dig wells, clean ponds, repair roads, and build schools using local resources. They are compensated with material resources including clothing, utensils, furniture, and grain. The initiative became referred to as 'Dignity for Work'.

Not Just a Piece of Cloth 
Anshu initiated the "Not Just a Piece of Cloth" campaign after the 2004 tsunami. According to him, "we dealt with more than 100 tracks of post-disaster cloth wastage on the roads of Tamil Nadu. The unwearable cloth from this lot was turned into cloth menstrual pads ...".

Rahat 
An earthquake in Uttarkashi triggered Gupta's involvement with disaster relief and rehabilitation. For nearly two decades, he has been working on disasters from earthquakes to tsunamis, cyclones, and floods. Goonj's initiative "Rahat" evolved into an active network of stakeholders in rural and urban India, ensuring timely response for generating need-based disaster relief and rehabilitation efforts.

Recognition 

 Ramon Magsaysay Award
 Ashoka and Schwab Fellowship
 CNN IBN Real Heroes award in the women welfare segment
 Social Entrepreneur of the Year Award by Schwab Foundation for Social Entrepreneurship
 Forbes magazine listed Gupta as one of India's most powerful rural entrepreneurs
 Curry stone design prize
 AIMA (All India Management Association) Award
 Marico Innovation Award

References 

Year of birth missing (living people)
Living people
20th-century Indian businesspeople
20th-century Indian educators
Ashoka India Fellows
Businesspeople from Delhi
Indian Institute of Mass Communication alumni
Indian social entrepreneurs
Ramon Magsaysay Award winners
Social workers